The 2018 Ohio Attorney General election took place on November 6, 2018, to elect the attorney general of Ohio.

Incumbent Attorney General Mike DeWine was term-limited and ran for governor. Republican nominee and Ohio State Auditor Dave Yost defeated Democratic nominee and former US Attorney Steve Dettelbach in the general election.

Republican primary

Candidates

Nominee
 Dave Yost, State Auditor

Declined
 Keith Faber, state representative and former Ohio Senate President (ran for State Auditor)

Results

Democratic primary

Candidates

Nominee
 Steve Dettelbach, former United States Attorney for the Northern District of Ohio

Declined
 Connie Pillich, former state representative and nominee for Ohio State Treasurer in 2014 (ran for Governor)
 Joe Schiavoni, Minority Leader of the Ohio Senate (ran for Governor)

Results

General election

Candidates
 Dave Yost, State Auditor
 Steve Dettelbach, former United States Attorney for the Northern District of Ohio

Endorsements

Polling
{| class=wikitable
|- valign= bottom
! Poll source
! Date(s)administered
! Samplesize
! Margin oferror
! style="width:100px;"|DaveYost (R)
! style="width:100px;"|SteveDettelbach (D)
! Undecided
|-
| Cygnal (R)
| align=center| October 30–31, 2018
| align=center| 503
| align=center| ± 4.4%
|  align=center| 46%
| align=center| 43%
| align=center| 12%
|-
| Baldwin Wallace University
| align=center| October 19–27, 2018
| align=center| 1,051
| align=center| ± 3.8%
| align=center| 38%
|  align=center| 40%
| align=center| 20%
|-
| Change Research (D-Innovation Ohio)
| align=center| August 31 – September 4, 2018
| align=center| 822
| align=center| ± 3.0%
|  align=center| 41%
| align=center| 37%
| align=center| 22%
|-
| Fallon Research
| align=center| May 21–25, 2018
| align=center| 800
| align=center| ± 3.5%
|  align=center| 41%
| align=center| 32%
| align=center| 27%

Results
Dave Yost won the general election by a 4.4% margin of victory.

See also 

 2018 Ohio elections
 2018 United States attorney general elections

References 

Attorney General
Ohio
Ohio Attorney General elections